McClusky is a surname. Notable people with the surname include:

C. Wade McClusky (1902–1976), United States Navy aviator
George W. McClusky (1861–1912), American police officer
John V. McClusky, American astronomer
Leigh McClusky, Australian journalist and presenter

See also
McCluskey